

Events

March events
 March 1 – Opening throughout of the Manchester and Leeds Railway, the first to cross the Pennines of England (via Summit Tunnel).
 March 29 – The Glasgow, Paisley and Greenock Railway opened between Glasgow Bridge Street railway station and Greenock.

May events
 May – James Bowen succeeds Eleazer Lord as president of the Erie Railroad.

June events
 June 14 – The first section of the Bristol and Exeter Railway's main line is opened between Bristol and Bridgwater in England.
 June 30 – Great Western Railway of England completed throughout between London and Bristol Temple Meads railway station, including Box Tunnel.

July events
 July 5 – Thomas Cook arranges his first excursion, taking 570 temperance campaigners on the Midland Counties Railway from Leicester to a rally in Loughborough, England.

September events
 September 19 – Inauguration of first international railway line (between Strasbourg (France) and Basel (Switzerland), but with a terminus in Basel; first continuous line October 15, 1843, between Antwerp (Belgium) and Köln (Germany)).
 September 21 – The London and Brighton Railway is opened throughout, in England.

Unknown date events
 Draughtsman William Howe and pattern-maker William Williams of Robert Stephenson and Company in Newcastle upon Tyne originate Stephenson valve gear for steam locomotives.
 Joseph R. Anderson becomes manager of the American steam locomotive manufacturing firm Tredegar Iron Works.

Births

Deaths

References